Vladimir Vladimirovich Kenigson (November 7, 1907 – November 17, 1986) was a Soviet and Russian film and stage actor. People's Artist of the USSR (1982).

Biography and career
Vladimir Kenigson was born in the family of barrister Vladimir Petrovich Kenigson in Simferopol. He graduated from the school at Simferopol Drama Theatre in 1925 and was admitted to the theater group. Then he played at the theater in Kuybyshev, Dnipropetrovsk and other cities. He was noticed on the stage by Alexander Tairov and was invited into their group.

In the years 1940-1949 Kenigson worked in Kamerny Theatre under the direction of Alexander Tairov, where he became a partner Alisa Koonen - in the performances of "Madame Bovary" (Rodolphe) and "Guilty Without Guilt" (Neznamov). After the closure of the Kamerny Theatre in 1949, on the advice of Tairov, he joined the Maly Academic Theatre.

At the same time Vladimir Kenigson starred in the Mikheil Chiaureli's film The Fall of Berlin, where he played the role of the Nazi general Krebs. For this, Kenigson was awarded the Stalin Prize by Joseph Stalin himself, who was delighted with his performance. Therefore, from the very first steps on one of the oldest Russian scenes Kenigson took the leading position in the company.

From 1949-1986 Kenigson was a permanent member of the troupe at Maly Academic Theatre in Moscow. There his stage partners were such stars as Elena Gogoleva, Vera Pashennaya, Elina Bystritskaya, Boris Babochkin, Mikhail Zharov, Nikolay Annenkov, Viktor Pavlov, Yury Solomin and many other notable Soviet and Russian actors. He played over 60 roles on stage and 30 roles in film and on TV. In addition to roles in movies he worked on dubbing of foreign films and cartoons, actors who talk with his voice: Jean Gabin, Louis de Funès and Totò.

Vladimir Kenigson is buried at the Vagankovo Cemetery at the 58th site, next to his son-in-law Alexey Eybozhenko.

Personal life
 Daughter — Natalia Kenigson.
 Son-in-law — actor Alexey Eybozhenko.
 Grandson — TV and radio presenter Alexey Eybozhenko Jr.

Selected filmography
 The Fall of Berlin (1950) as General Hans Krebs
 The Unforgettable Year 1919 (1951) as Paul Dukes
 Certificate of Maturity (1954) as Pyotr Germanovich Strakhov, teacher
 Miles of Fire (1957) as Sergei Beklemishev
 Major Whirlwind (1967) as Traub
 Passenger from the "Equator" (1968) as Pavel Gabush
 Seventeen Moments of Spring (1973) as ex-minister Krause
 The Flight of Mr. McKinley (1975) as episode
 Moon Rainbow (1983) as Charles Rogan

Selected foreign films
 Fanfan la Tulipe (1952) — Noël Roquevert as Fier-à-Bras
 The Snows of Kilimanjaro (1952) — Leo G. Carroll as Uncle Bill
 Les Misérables (1958) — Bernard Blier as Javert
 Le Bossu (1959) — François Chaumette as Philippe de Gonzague
Inherit the Wind (1960) — Frederic March as Matthew Harrison Brady
 The Mysteries of Paris (1962) — Raymond Pellegrin as Baron de Lansignac
 The Black Tulip (1964) — Robert Manuel as Prince Alexandre de Grassillac de Morvan-Le-Breau
 Lemonade Joe (1964) — Miloš Kopecký as Horace Badman, alias "Hogofogo"
 Fantômas (1964) — Louis de Funès as Commissioner Juve
 The Saragossa Manuscript (1965) — Gustaw Holoubek as Don Pedro Velasquez
 The Sucker (1965) — Louis de Funès as Léopold Saroyan
 Fantômas se déchaîne (1965) — Louis de Funès as Commissioner Juve
 Old Surehand (1965) — Larry Pennell as General Jack O’Neil
 Strike First Freddy (1965) — Martin Hansen as Dr. Pax
 The Sons of Great Bear (1966) — Jiří Vršťala as Jim Fred Clark
 The Big Restaurant (1966) — Louis de Funès as Mr. Septime, boss of a big Parisian restaurant
 Fantômas contre Scotland Yard (1967) — Louis de Funès as Commissioner Juve
 Oscar (1967) — Louis de Funès as Bertrand Barnier
 Romeo and Juliet (1968) — Antonio Pierfederici as Lord Montague
 L'homme orchestre (1970) — Louis de Funès as Mr. Edouard, alias Evan Evans
 La Horse (1970) — Pierre Dux as investigating magistrate
 The Married Couple of the Year Two (1971) — Pierre Brasseur as Gosselin
 Tecumseh (1972) — Wolfgang Greese as Governor William Harrison
 The Tall Blond Man with One Black Shoe (1972) — Bernard Blier as Bernard Milan
 Oklahoma Crude (1973) — Jack Palance as Hellman
 Zorro (1975) — Stanley Baker as Colonel Huerta
 Three Days of the Condor (1975) — John Houseman as Wabash
 Concorde Affaire '79 (1979) — Joseph Cotten as Milland

Selected cartoons
 Gena the Crocodile (1969) as Salesman
 Flying Phantom Ship (1969) as Mr. Kuroshio (Soviet dub)
 The Blue Bird (1970) as Rich man
 The Mystery of the Third Planet (1981) as Robot waiter, robot from planet Shelezyaka

Awards
 Stalin Prize, 1st class (1950) – for his portrayal of General Hans Krebs in The Fall of Berlin
 Honored Artist of the RSFSR (1954)
 People's Artist of the RSFSR (1968)
 Order of the Red Banner of Labour (1974)
 People's Artist of the USSR (1982)

External links

1907 births
1986 deaths
20th-century Russian male actors
Actors from Simferopol
People from Taurida Governorate
Honored Artists of the RSFSR
People's Artists of the RSFSR
People's Artists of the USSR
Stalin Prize winners
Recipients of the Order of the Red Banner of Labour
Soviet people of Swedish descent
Russian male film actors
Russian male stage actors
Russian male television actors
Russian male voice actors
Soviet male film actors
Soviet male stage actors
Soviet male television actors
Soviet male voice actors
Burials at Vagankovo Cemetery